= Time-late =

Time-late is a term used primarily in naval warfare that refers to the time lag between some datum's generation and actions taken based on it. In other words, it is something that is not undertaken in real-time.

It is often used in the context of a weapon's time of flight: the time between launch and (intended) contact with a target results in a time-late.
